Dipeptidyl aminopeptidase III may refer to:
Dipeptidyl-peptidase III, an enzyme
DPP3, a gene